Malcolm Kenneth McKenzie (January 1849 – 16 June 1927) was an Australian politician.

He was born in Broadford to grazier Alexander McKenzie and Mary McCracken. He attended Scotch College and then worked on his father's property, which he inherited on his father's death. He married Hannah Le Procka Cain, with whom he had two sons. In 1892 he was elected to the Victorian Legislative Assembly for Anglesey, by which time he was totally blind.

He was defeated in 1903 and contested Upper Goulburn unsuccessfully in 1904, 1907 and 1908, before winning re-election in 1911. He served as a backbench Liberal and Nationalist until his retirement from politics in 1920. McKenzie died in Caulfield in 1927.

References

1849 births
1927 deaths
Nationalist Party of Australia members of the Parliament of Victoria
Members of the Victorian Legislative Assembly